Xinshi is a town of west-central Changshou District in Chongqing Municipality, People's Republic of China, located  northeast of central Chongqing. , it has eight villages under its administration.

Administrative division
The town is divided into 8 villages, the following areas: Hongtudi Village, Heshijing Village, Xinhe Village, Xintong Village, Xinshi Village, Dongmen Village, Yan'ertuo Village, and Huimin Village (红土地村、河石井村、新合村、新同村、新市村、东门村、堰耳沱村、惠民村).

References

External links

Divisions of Changshou District
Subdistricts of the People's Republic of China